This is a list of singles that have peaked in the top 10 of the French Singles Chart in 2014. 67 singles were in the top 10 this year, 7 of which were in the number-one spot.

Top 10 singles

Entries by artists
The following table shows artists who achieved two or more top 10 entries in 2014. The figures include both main artists and featured artists and the peak positions in brackets.

See also
2014 in music
List of number-one hits of 2014 (France)

References

External links 
 LesCharts.com

Top
France
Top 10 singles in 2014
France 2014